The muumuu  or muumuu is a loose dress of Hawaiian origin that hangs from the shoulder and is like a cross between a shirt and a robe.  Like the aloha shirt, muumuu exports are often brilliantly colored with floral patterns of generic Polynesian motifs.  Muumuus for local Hawaiian residents are more subdued in tone.  Muumuus are no longer as widely worn at work as an aloha shirt, but continue to be the preferred formal dress for weddings and festivals such as the Merrie Monarch hula competition.  Muumuus are also popular as maternity wear because they do not restrict the waist.

Etymology and history
The word muumuu means "cut off" in Hawaiian, because the dress originally lacked a yoke. Originally it was a shorter, informal version of the more formal holokū.  Holokū was the original name for the Mother Hubbard dress introduced by Protestant missionaries to Hawaii in the 1820s.  The holokū featured long sleeves and a floor-length unfitted dress falling from a high-necked yoke.  Over the years, the holokū approximated more closely to European and American fashions.  It might have a fitted waist and even a train for the evening.  As the holokū became more elaborate, the muumuu, a shortened version, became popular for informal wear.

References

Further reading
Housedress (muumuu), 1970s, in the Staten Island Historical Society Online Collections Database

External links

Dresses
History of Oceanian clothing
Polynesian clothing
Symbols of Hawaii
Hawaiian words and phrases